Elections were held on November 14, 1988 in the Regional Municipality of Ottawa-Carleton. This page lists the election results for local mayors and councils of the RMOC in 1988.  

Following the elections, Andy Haydon was re-elected as the chair of Regional Council on December 14, by the elected members of the council. He was acclaimed to the position, as no councillor nominated an opponent, though public servant Douglas Campbell had declared an interest in the job.

Regional Council
The following were elected to regional council either directly on election day or by the local councils afterwards.

Cumberland
Mayoral race

Council

Gloucester
Mayoral race

Council

Goulbourn
Mayoral race

Council

Kanata
Mayoral race

Council

Nepean
Mayoral race

Council

Osgoode

Mayoral race

Council
Four elected at large. Elected councillors indicated in bold.

Ottawa

Mayor race

Rideau
Mayoral race

Council

Rockcliffe Park
Mayoral race

Council
Four elected at large. Elected councillors indicated in bold.

Vanier
Mayoral race

Council

West Carleton
Mayoral race

Council

References

Sources
''Ottawa Citizen, November 15, 1988, pgs C1-5

Municipal elections in Ottawa
1988 Ontario municipal elections